Lindamulla Pattini Devalaya is an ancient Devalaya, situated in Badulla Divisional Secretariat, Sri Lanka. The shrine is dedicated to Sinhalese goddess Pattini who is believed to be the patron goddess of fertility and health. The devalaya has been formally recognised by the government as an archaeological protected monument. The designation was declared on 8 July 2005 under the government Gazette number 1401.

The temple
The temple consists of the Maligava (The main Shrine room), kitchen and Buddha shrine with a Bodhi Tree. However, there is no Sinhasana Mandiraya (Chamber of Throne) in front of the main shrine room. The outer wall of the shrine has been decorated with various old paintings.

See also
Halpe Pattini Devalaya
Nawagamuwa Pattini Devalaya

References

Archaeological protected monuments in Badulla District
Tourist attractions in Badulla District
Buildings and structures in Badulla District